POWER cluster is a project that aims to establish a business cluster for offshore wind power in the North Sea Region. It is part-funded by the North Sea Region Programme which is part of the transnational branch (IVB) of Interreg, one of the regional policy instruments of the European Union under the European Regional Development Fund (ERDF). It is the successor of the POWER project funded under Interreg IIIB.

POWER cluster is led by the Bremerhaven Economic Development Company in Germany together with 17 other participants from Germany, United Kingdom, Denmark, The Netherlands, Norway and Sweden.

Offshore wind power
Compared to onshore wind power, offshore wind power is more complex and costly to install and maintain but also has several key advantages. Winds are typically stronger and more stable at sea, resulting in significantly higher production per unit installed. Wind turbines can also be bigger than on land because it is easier to transport very large turbine components by sea. Offshore wind farms also have less potential to cause concern among neighbouring residents.

The wind resources over Europe's seas represent a vast, local source of clean, renewable energy. By generating electricity without fossil fuels and by creating jobs in a sector in which some European businesses are global leaders, offshore wind can contribute to reduced greenhouse gas emissions, to ensuring security of supply and to improving EU competitiveness.

Project objectives
Developing an offshore wind power cluster in the North Sea Region (NSR)
Adapting and preparing the NSR workforce to the needs of offshore wind energy
Creating a business platform to foster offshore wind energy development in the NSR
Communicating the benefits of offshore wind energy to the public

Project partners

The lead beneficiary of the POWER cluster project is the Bremerhaven Economic Development Company in Germany. Furthermore, there are 17 beneficiaries from six countries participating in the project.

References

Offshore wind farms in the North Sea